Seh Cheshmeh and Seh Chashmeh and Sehcheshmeh may refer to:
 Seh Cheshmeh, Kerman
 Seh Cheshmeh, Kermanshah